A referendum on allowing casino gambling was held in the United States Virgin Islands on 3 November 1992. The result was binding only if a majority of registered voters participated. The proposal was rejected by a narrow margin, but was later approved in a 1994 referendum.

References

Referendums in the United States Virgin Islands
1992 in the United States Virgin Islands
1992 referendums
1992 elections in the Caribbean
Gambling referendums